Once Upon an Angel (French:Peau d'Ange) is a 2002 French romantic drama film directed by Vincent Perez, starring Morgane Moré and Guillaume Depardieu.

Plot
Grégoire reluctantly returns to the countryside in order to oversee his mother's funeral. Being back in the small town where he was raised upsets him, as he is not ready yet to accept the fact his mother died. While looking for some comfort and solace, he meets a maid named Angèle. He manages to impress her by making up he was an important manager, although he only has a minor position in a cosmetics company. After they have spent the night in a hotel, he just leaves her but she cannot forget him, in particular because he was her first lover at all. Subsequently, she follows him and even manages to get hired as the maid of one of his colleagues. However, she then has to realise that Grégoire is about to become the son-in-law of his boss. Angèle observes how he is going to marry another woman for other reasons than love.

Cast
  as Angèle
 Guillaume Depardieu as Grégoire
 Dominique Blanc as Sister Augustine
  as Laure
  as Josiane
 Valeria Bruni-Tedeschi as Angèle's solicitor
 Olivier Gourmet as Faivre
 Marine Delterme as Faivre's wife
 Michel Vuillermoz as Grégoire's uncle
  as Amira
 Hélène de Saint-Père as Ms Artaud
 Laurent Terzieff as Mr Grenier
  as Jocelyne
 André Marcon as Angèle's father
  as Doctor Artaud

Release
Once Upon an Angel premiered at the Montreal World Film Festival on 24 August 2002, and was screened at the Festival International du Film Francophone de Namur on 28 September 2002. The film was released in France on 9 October 2002. An English subtitled direct-to-video version, including a making-of, a soundtrack, deleted scenes, a film poster and two short films, was released on 28 May 2003.

Accolades
At the Cabourg Film Festival 2003, Moré was awarded the Swann d'Or for Best Actress.

Critical response

References

External links
 
 
 Peau d'Ange on Vincent Perez' official website

2002 films
2002 directorial debut films
2002 romantic drama films
EuropaCorp films
Films directed by Vincent Pérez
Films shot in France
2000s French-language films
French romantic drama films
2000s French films